Daniel Funke (born 23 July 1981) is a German journalist. Since 2019 he has been the head of the Berlin office and lobbyist at BurdaVerlag, a division of German media company Hubert Burda Media.

From 2002 to 2009, he studied German studies ("Germanistik") and history at Humboldt-Universität Berlin. Between 2004 and 2007, he also worked at the private TV channel Sat. 1 and the magazine Blitz ("Flash"). In 2007, he became an editor at Bunte, a German people magazine, and in 2012, the head of its Berlin office.

Personal life
Funke has been married to German politician and former federal secretary of health Jens Spahn (CDU) since 2017.

General
Funke caused controversy with a story he wrote for Bunte magazine about the then-new US ambassador Richard Grenell, which presented Grenell in a very positive light. The story didn't reveal that Funke and Spahn were friends with Grenell and his partner Matt Lashey and could therefore be seen as a political favour to ease Grenell's entry into German politics.

FFP 2 masks dealings
Funke again caused controversy in March 2021 when it was revealed that his employer had sold 570,000 FFP 2 masks without a formal bidding process conducted by the Federal Ministry of Health, which was led by his husband, Jens Spahn.

References 

1981 births
Living people
Gay journalists
German male journalists
German LGBT journalists